Ringspot, a symptom of various plant viral infections, may refer to:

Carnation ringspot virus, plant pathogenic virus of the family Tombusviridae
Hydrangea ringspot virus, plant pathogenic virus of the family Flexiviridae
Odontoglossum ringspot virus, plant pathogenic virus
Papaya ringspot virus, plant pathogenic virus in the genus Potyvirus and the virus family Potyviridae
Potato black ringspot virus, plant pathogenic virus of the family Comoviridae
Prunus necrotic ringspot virus, plant pathogenic virus of the family Bromoviridae
Raspberry ringspot virus, plant pathogenic virus of the family Comoviridae
Strawberry latent ringspot virus, plant pathogenic virus of the family Comoviridae
Tobacco ringspot virus, plant pathogenic virus in the plant virus family Comoviridae
Tomato ringspot virus, plant pathogenic virus of the family Comoviridae